The Goodyear Centennials were a professional baseball team  in the United States. The team was based in Goodyear, Arizona and a member of the independent Freedom Pro Baseball League, which was not affiliated with Minor League Baseball. They played their home games at Goodyear Ballpark. They were founded in 2012 as the Arizona Centennials and played their games at Scottsdale Stadium in Scottsdale, Arizona before moving to Goodyear in 2013.

2013 roster

References

External links 
 Goodyear Centennials

Freedom Pro Baseball League teams
Baseball teams established in 2012
Professional baseball teams in Arizona
Goodyear, Arizona
Defunct independent baseball league teams
Defunct baseball teams in Arizona
Baseball teams disestablished in 2013